This is a list of the tallest buildings in Alberta that ranks skyscrapers and high-rise buildings in the province of Alberta, Canada, by height.

Alberta's history of skyscrapers began with the Grain Exchange Building (1910) in Calgary, and the Tegler Building (1911) in Edmonton.

Tallest Buildings
This includes spires and architectural details but does not include antenna masts. An equal sign (=) following a rank indicates the same height between two or more buildings. Freestanding observation and/or telecommunication towers, while not habitable buildings, are included for comparison purposes; however, they are not ranked. One such tower is the Calgary Tower.

Timeline of tallest buildings
This is a list of buildings that in the past held the title of tallest building in Alberta.

See also

 Architecture of Canada
 List of tallest buildings in Calgary
 List of tallest buildings in Edmonton
 List of tallest buildings in Canada

References

Alberta
Tallest